The volleyball tournaments at the 2015 European Youth Summer Olympic Festival in Tbilisi played between 26 July and 1 August.

Medalist events

 
2015 European Youth Summer Olympic Festival
2015
Volleyball competitions in Georgia (country)
European Youth Summer Olympic Festival